The Naked Civil Servant is the 1968 autobiography of British gay icon Quentin Crisp, adapted into a 1975 film of the same name starring John Hurt.

The book began as a 1964 radio interview with Crisp conducted by his friend and fellow eccentric Philip O'Connor. A managing director at Jonathan Cape heard the interview and commissioned the publication. Having sold only 3,500 copies when first released, the book became a success when it was republished following the television movie broadcast.

The book contains many anecdotes about Crisp's life from childhood to middle age, including troubles he faced by refusing to hide his homosexuality and flamboyant lifestyle during a time when such behaviour was criminalized in the United Kingdom. Crisp also recalls his various jobs including book designer, nude model, and prostitute.

The title derives from Crisp's quip about being an art model; employed by art colleges, models are ultimately paid by the Department for Education. They are essentially civil employees who are naked during office hours.

References

British autobiographies
Quentin Crisp
LGBT autobiographies
1968 non-fiction books
Jonathan Cape books
1960s LGBT literature
LGBT literature in the United Kingdom